UGCC may refer to:
 Ukrainian Greek Catholic Church, the largest Eastern Rite Church in the Roman Catholic communion
 United Gold Coast Convention, a post-Second World War political party
 United Ghanaian Community Church, 251 E. Waverly Road, Wyncote, PA 19095, a chartered denomination of the Presbyterian Church, USA